Edward Henry Pember QC/KC JP (28 May 1833 – 5 April 1911) was an English barrister.

He was educated at Harrow School and Christ Church, Oxford.  His son was Francis William Pember, Vice-Chancellor of Oxford University.

References 

 J. B. Atlay, ‘Pember, Edward Henry (1833–1911)’, rev. Eric Metcalfe, Oxford Dictionary of National Biography, Oxford University Press, 2004 accessed 8 April 2013
 ‘PEMBER, Edward Henry’, Who Was Who, A & C Black, an imprint of Bloomsbury Publishing plc, 1920–2008; online edn, Oxford University Press, Dec 2007 accessed 8 April 2013
 Mr. E. H. Pember, K.C. The Times, Thursday, Apr 06, 1911; pg. 11; Issue 39552; col C.

1833 births
1911 deaths
Alumni of Christ Church, Oxford
People educated at Harrow School
19th-century English lawyers